

Senatorial by-election
A by-election for Senator was held in 2004.

Results
Candidate (1 Elected) 
Dick Shenton 7144 
Juliette Gallichan 1715
Robert Weston 1284
Kevin Lewis 724
Robert Brown 264 
Terry Coutanche 249
Spoilt Papers 13, Percentage Turnout 28.32

References

By 2004
2004 in Jersey